Moonbase Alpha is a NASA computer simulation, simulator of a moonbase.

Moonbase Alpha may also refer to:

 Moonbase Alpha (Space: 1999), a fictional Moon base from the TV show Space: 1999
 The Moonbase Alpha Technical Manual, companion book for Space: 1999
 Moon Base Alpha series, a 2014–2018 book series by Stuart Gibbs

See also
 Mars Base Alpha, a proposed lunar base; see SpaceX Mars transportation infrastructure
 Moon base
 Tranquility Base, the first staffed base on the Moon
 Moon Base One, a 1960 science fiction novel
 Moonbase 3, a 1973 British science fiction television programme
 Moonbase (disambiguation)
 Alpha (disambiguation)